Bến Lức is a rural district (huyện) of Long An province in the Mekong Delta region of Vietnam.  the district had a population of 128,849. The district covers 290 km². The district capital lies at Bến Lức.

Divisions
The district is divided into 15 communes:

 Thị trấn Bến Lức
 Mỹ Yên
 Phước Lợi
 Long Hiệp
 Nhựt Chánh
 Thạnh Đức
 Bình Đức
 An Thạnh
 Thanh Phú
 Tân Bửu
 Tân Hòa
 Lương Hòa
 Thạnh Hòa
 Lương Bình
 Thạnh Lợi

References

Districts of Long An province